The Iranian American Bar Association ("IABA") was formed in 2000 in the District of Columbia and is a tax-exempt, non-profit organization under section 501(c)(3) of the Internal Revenue Code.

Background
IABA is organized for charitable, educational, and professional purposes, including promoting the social, economic, professional and educational advancement of the Iranian American community, and the community at large. While headquartered in Washington D.C., IABA is a national organization seeking to expand professional and community relationships by establishing local chapters throughout the United States. Starting with four founding members, IABA's membership has grown to over 1200 attorneys and law students nationally, with a particularly strong presence in Washington D.C., New York City, and California, but with members also from many other states. IABA recruits the most distinguished members of the Iranian American legal community as its Directors and Officers, and upholds the highest levels of professional integrity and excellence.

IABA is a non-religious, independent organization and is not in any way affiliated with any other organization.  IABA is not a lobbying or advocacy group, but primarily an educational organization. As such, IABA seeks to educate and inform the Iranian American community about legal issues of interest, and to ensure that the American public at large as well as our representatives and other government officials are fully and accurately informed on legal matters of interest and concern to the Iranian American community. In addition, IABA strives to publicize and promote the achievements of Iranian American lawyers and other legal professionals.

As a 501(c)(3) organization all contributions to IABA are tax deductible.

Programs and activities
 Official Publications: Annual IABA Review addressing important legal issues of interest to the Iranian-American community; working group documents on specific legal questions and issues; and a bi-monthly e-Newsletter
 Pro Bono Representation: Assists countless number of indigent individuals and non-profit organizations secure legal representation for their matters
 Continuing Legal Education: Obtained CLE accreditation in California to provide programs on continuing legal education
 Panels with Prominent Speakers: Hosted prominent speakers, including Nobel Laureate Shirin Ebadi (New York), Congressman Howard Berman (Los Angeles), Superior Court Judge Susan Etezadi (Northern California) and Former Assistant Secretary of State Goli Ameri (Washington, D.C.)
 Community Outreach: Hosts courses around the nation on important legal issues, including developing a living trust, intellectual property law and patent applications, adjustment of status for visa-holders, and criminal law issues
 IABA Scholarship: Issues one or more scholarships each year to law students in good standing enrolled in an accredited law school in the United States.
 Public Interest Fund: Established a public interest fund to award attorneys working for the interest of the community
 Social and Business Networking: Hosted dinners and business networking programs for lawyers and law students
 Government Relations: Held direct meetings with the US Department of State and US Department of Treasury to discuss issues impacting Iranian-Americans.  On August 25, 2010, IABA announced that it would file an amicus curiae brief with the United States Court of Appeals for the Second Circuit on United States v. Banki.  It has also hired lawyers to request further guidance from OFAC on import of goods from Iran.

Leadership
Each year the Iranian American Bar Association convenes an annual membership meeting during which IABA members in good standing review the organization's accomplishments during the past year, help identify objectives for the coming year and elect a new board of directors. IABA has recruited distinguished members of the Iranian American legal community as members of its Board of Directors and as its Officers, who uphold the highest level of professional integrity and excellence.  Currently, IABA's board and an advisory board includes lawyers from several American Lawyer 100 firms, including Wilson Sonsini Goodrich & Rosati, Paul, Hastings, Janofsky & Walker, Perkins Coie, Wilmer Cutler Pickering Hale and Dorr, Morrison & Foerster, Skadden, Arps, Slate, Meagher & Flom, Baker & McKenzie, and Gibson, Dunn & Crutcher.

Past IABA Presidents
 2001-2002: Babak Hoghooghi
 2002-2003: Babak Hoghooghi
 2003-2004: Babak Hoghooghi
 2004-2005: Babak Hoghooghi
 2005-2006: John Radsen
 2006-2007: John Radsen
 2007-2008: Robert Babayi
 2008-2009: Nema Milaninia
 2009-2010: Nema Milaninia
 2010-2011: Karen Ostad
 2011-2012: Nahal Iravani-Sani
 2012-2013: Dawn Sepideh Mortazavi
 2013-2014: Erich Ferrari
 2014-2015: Babak Yousefzadeh
 2015-2016: Babak Yousefzadeh
 2016-2017: Babak Yousefzadeh
 2017-2018: Babak Yousefzadeh
 2018-2019: Ramin Montazeri
 2019-2020: Ramin Montazeri
 2020-2021: Ramin Montazeri
 2021-2022: Ramin Montazeri
 2022-2023: Saiena Shafiezadeh
 2023-Present: Yasmin Bigdeli

IABA Chapters
The Iranian American Bar Association has eight active chapters across the United States.
Northern California;
Los Angeles;
Orange County;
San Diego;
New York;
Phoenix;
South East;
Washington DC

External links
 Official IABA Web Site

See also
Bar Association
List of Iranian Americans
Iranian citizens abroad

References

Iranian-American culture in Washington, D.C.
Iranian-American organizations